In Mandaean cosmology, the Sea of Suf (or Sea of Sup) is a primordial sea in the World of Darkness. It is analogous to Tehom in the Book of Genesis. A great sea that the soul has to pass in the first steps of ascending. The limit of worldly desire.

See also

 (Hebrew cognate)

References

Water and religion
Chaos (cosmogony)
Mandaean cosmology